KCQX may refer to:

 Chatham Municipal Airport (ICAO code KCQX)
 KCQX-LP, a defunct low-power radio station (106.9 FM) formerly licensed to Cuchara, Colorado, United States